Cryptolechia fascirupta is a moth in the family Depressariidae. It was described by Wang in 2003. It is found in the Chinese provinces of Fujian, Guizhou and Sichuan.

References

Moths described in 2003
Cryptolechia (moth)